Top Trumps is a 10-part British television series based on the famous card game. It aired on Channel 5 in 2008. It was produced by Lion Television and presented by Robert Llewellyn and Ashley Hames.

The show is a competition between the two presenters. Each chooses one type of the machines presented and found out facts about it. At the end of the show, each presenter chose two Trump factors to use in which they think their chosen machine will be best. A fifth trump factor gets randomly chosen. The winner is the one with most Trump factors.

Topics
This is a list of the machines that were covered in the series:
Episode 1: Super Yachts
Episode 2: High Performance Planes
Episode 3: Super Ships
Episode 4: Fire Engines
Episode 5: Warships
Episode 6: All Terrain Vehicles
Episode 7: Rescue Rigs
Episode 8: Supercars
Episode 9: Helicopters
Episode 10: Mammoth Earth Movers

See also
Top Trumps
Top Trumps Adventures

References
http://www.history.co.uk/shows/top-trumps/season-1/episode-guide.html

External links
 

Top Trumps
Channel 5 (British TV channel) original programming
2008 British television series debuts
2008 British television series endings
Television series by All3Media
English-language television shows